Peter Bergen (born December 12, 1962) is an American journalist, author, and producer who is CNN's national security analyst, a vice president at New America, and a professor at Arizona State University. Bergen has written or edited ten books. Three of the books were New York Times bestsellers, four of the books were named among the best non-fiction books of the year by the Washington Post, and they have been translated into 24 languages. Three books were turned into documentaries for HBO and CNN, which were nominated for an Emmy and won an Emmy. Holy War, Inc.: Inside the Secret World of Osama bin Laden (2001); The Osama bin Laden I Know: An Oral History of al Qaeda's Leader (2006); The Longest War: The Enduring Conflict between America and Al-Qaeda (2011); Manhunt: The Ten-Year Search for Bin Laden From 9/11 to Abbottabad (2012); Talibanistan: Negotiating the Borders Between Terror, Politics, and Religion (2013); Drone Wars: Transforming Conflict, Law, and Policy (2014); United States of Jihad: Investigating America's Homegrown Terrorists (2016); Trump and His Generals: The Cost of Chaos (2019); The Rise and Fall of Osama Bin Laden (2021); and Understanding the New Proxy Wars (2022) He produced the first television interview with Osama bin Laden in 1997, which aired on CNN.

Background
Bergen was born in Minneapolis and grew up in London, the son of Donald Thomas Bergen and Sarah Elizabeth (née Lampert) Bergen. Her grandfather, Leonard Lampert, founded the Lampert Lumber Company. His family is Roman Catholic. He attended Ampleforth College in North Yorkshire before receiving an Open Scholarship to New College, Oxford, in 1981, where he graduated with a degree in modern history. Bergen is married to the documentary director/producer Tresha Mabile.  They have two children.

Career

Bergen is Vice President for Global Studies and Fellows at New America, a non-partisan think tank in Washington, D.C. He also serves as New America's Director of the International Security and Future of War Programs. He is a Professor of Practice at the School of Politics and Global Studies at Arizona State University where he is the co-director of the Center on the Future of War, a research fellow at Fordham University's Center on National Security, and CNN's national security analyst. 
 
He has held teaching positions at Harvard Kennedy School at Harvard University and the Paul H. Nitze School of Advanced International Studies at Johns Hopkins University.

Bergen has worked at CNN in a variety of roles since 1990 as an analyst, correspondent, and producer. He has worked at New America in a variety of roles since 2001 as a fellow, director and vice president.

Bergen is on the editorial board of Studies in Conflict & Terrorism, the leading scholarly journal in the field, and has testified before multiple congressional committees, including the U.S. House of Representatives Homeland Security Committee and the U.S. Senate Foreign Relations Committee. He is a member of the Homeland Security Experts Group. Bergen is the chairman of the board of the Global Special Operations Foundation, which is a non-profit advocating for the interests of special operations forces. He is the founding editor of the Coronavirus Daily Brief.

He was a fellow at New York University's Center on Law & Security between 2003 and 2011, and was a contributing editor at The New Republic for many years and also the editor of the South Asia Channel and South Asia Daily, online publications of Foreign Policy magazine from 2009 to 2016.

Books
 
Holy War, Inc. (2001), a New York Times bestseller, and The Osama bin Laden I Know (2006) were named among the best non-fiction books of the year by The Washington Post. Documentaries based on both books were nominated for Emmys in 2001 and 2006. Bergen was the recipient of the 2000 Leonard Silk Journalism Fellowship and was the Pew Journalist in Residence at the School of Advanced International Studies at Johns Hopkins University in 2001 while writing Holy War, Inc.

His third book, The Longest War: The Enduring Conflict between America and Al-Qaeda (2011), a New York Times bestseller, gave an overview of the War on Terror and was named by the Guardian and Newsweek as one of the key books about terrorism in the past decade. The Longest War also won the Washington Institute's Gold Prize for best book about the Middle East and was named by Amazon, Kirkus and Foreign Policy as one of the best books of 2011.

Bergen's 2012 New York Times bestseller was Manhunt: The Ten-Year Search for Bin Laden From 9/11 to Abbottabad. The Washington Post named Manhunt one of the best non-fiction books of 2012, and The Guardian named it one of the key books on Islamist extremism. It was the 2012 Sunday Times (UK) Current Affairs Book of the Year. The book was awarded the Overseas Press Club Cornelius Ryan Award for best non-fiction book of 2012 on international affairs. Manhunt was the basis of the HBO documentary film, "Manhunt", which premiered at the Sundance Film Festival and won the Emmy award for Outstanding Documentary in 2013. Bergen was Executive Producer of the film. He was awarded the Stephen Ambrose History Award in 2014.

Bergen co-edited with Katherine Tiedemann Talibanistan: Negotiating the Borders Between Terror, Politics, and Religion, a collection of essays about the Taliban that was published by Oxford University Press in 2013. He co-edited with Daniel Rothenberg Drone Wars: Transforming Conflict, Law, and Policy, published by Cambridge University Press in 2014.

In 2016, Bergen published United States of Jihad: Investigating America's Homegrown Terrorists. It was named one of the best non-fiction books of 2016 by the Washington Post. HBO adapted the book for the documentary film Homegrown: The Counterterror Dilemma.

Bergen's Trump and His Generals: The Cost of Chaos was published in 2019.  The Washington Post described it as "the best single account of Trump's foreign policy to date." He published The Rise and Fall of Osama bin Laden in 2021. It was named one of the best nonfiction books of the year by the Los Angeles Times and Kirkus Reviews. The New York Times described it as "Meticulously documented, fluidly written and replete with riveting detail... Equally revealing about the Americans and their pursuit of him.”

Documentaries
Bergen has worked as a correspondent and producer for the National Geographic Channel, Discovery Channel, HBO, Showtime, and CNN Films. He co-produced with Tresha Mabile the National Geographic Channel documentary, American War Generals (2014). Bergen and Mabile also produced CNN Films' Legion of Brothers, which premiered at Sundance in January 2017. It was released in theaters in June 2017. It was nominated for an Emmy for Outstanding Politics and Government documentary in 2018. In 2020, together with the producers of Homeland, he produced the Showtime documentary, The Longest War, which documented the CIA's long involvement in Afghanistan.

On May 2, 2016, which was the five-year anniversary of the death of Osama bin Laden, CNN aired the documentary We Got Him: President Obama, Bin Laden, and the Future of the War on Terror. In addition to speaking with President Barack Obama in his first sit-down interview in the Situation Room, Bergen also conducted the first in-depth interview with the architect of the bin Laden raid, Admiral William H. McRaven, as well as interviewing senior administration officials including former Secretary of State Hillary Clinton.

Four of Bergen's books have been made into documentaries for CNN, HBO and National Geographic. The documentaries based on Holy War, Inc. and The Osama bin Laden I Know were nominated for Emmys in 2001 and 2006. Bergen was a producer of those films. Manhunt was the basis of the HBO documentary film, "Manhunt," which premiered at the Sundance Film Festival and won the Emmy Award for Outstanding Documentary in 2013. Bergen was Executive Producer of the film. HBO adapted United States of Jihad for the 2016 documentary film, "Homegrown: The Counterterror Dilemma." Bergen was Executive Producer of the film.

In 1997, as a producer for CNN, Bergen produced bin Laden's first television interview, in which he declared war against the United States for the first time to a Western audience. In 1994 he won the Overseas Press Club Edward R. Murrow award for best foreign affairs documentary for the CNN program "Kingdom of Cocaine," which was also nominated for an Emmy.

Bergen co-produced the CNN documentary, Terror Nation, which traced the links between Afghanistan and the bombers who attacked the World Trade Center for the first time in 1993. The documentary, which was shot in Afghanistan during the civil war there and aired in 1994, concluded that the country would be the source of additional anti-Western terrorism. From 1998 to 1999, Bergen worked as a correspondent-producer for CNN. He also produced documentaries on the Clinton administration, the Cali Cartel, the 1994 Republican takeover of Congress, and advances in AIDS research. He was program editor for CNN Impact, a news magazine co-production of CNN and TIME, from 1997 to 1998.

Previously, he worked for CNN Special Assignment as a producer on a wide variety of international and U.S. national stories, including the first network interview with white supremacist author, William Luther Pierce. From 1985 to 1990 he worked for ABC News in New York. In 1983, he traveled to Pakistan for the first time with two friends to make a documentary about the Afghan refugees fleeing the Soviet invasion of their country. The subsequent documentary, Refugees of Faith, was shown on Channel 4 (UK).

Journalism
Bergen has reported on al-Qaeda, Afghanistan, Pakistan, Iraq, ISIS and counterterrorism and homeland security for a variety of American newspapers and magazines including The New York Times, the Los Angeles Times, Foreign Affairs, The Washington Post, Wall Street Journal, The Atlantic, Rolling Stone, Time, The Nation, The National Interest, Mother Jones, Newsweek, and Vanity Fair. He writes a weekly column for CNN.com. His story on extraordinary rendition for Mother Jones was part of a package of stories nominated for a 2008 National Magazine Award. He has also written for newspapers and magazines around the world such as The Guardian, The Times, The Daily Telegraph, International Herald Tribune, Prospect, El Mundo (Spain), La Repubblica, The National (Abu Dhabi), Die Welt, and Der Spiegel.

In 2015, Seymour Hersh criticized Bergen for "view[ing] himself as the trustee of all things Bin Laden." That came after Bergen wrote a piece for CNN.com about Hersh's revisionist account in the London Review of Books about the raid that killed bin Laden. Bergen wrote that Hersh's account was "a farrago of nonsense that is contravened by a multitude of eyewitness accounts, inconvenient facts and simple common sense."

Works

  (Co-editor with Candace Rondeaux, Daniel Rothenberg, and David Sterman)
 
 
 
 
  (Co-editor with Daniel Rothenberg)
  (Co-editor with Katherine Tiedemann)

Congressional testimony

 US House Committee on Homeland Security, Global Terrorism: Threats to the Homeland. 10 September 2019.
 US House Committee on Homeland Security, Counterterrorism and Intelligence Subcommittee The Future of Counterterrorism: Addressing the Evolving Threat to Domestic Security. 28 February 2017.
 US Senate Committee on Homeland Security, Permanent Subcommittee on Investigations. ISIS Online: Countering Terrorist Radicalization & Recruitment on the Internet & Social Media. 6 July 2016.
 Statement to the U.S. Senate Committee on Homeland Security and Governmental Affairs. The Impact of ISIS on the Homeland and Refugee Resettlement. 19 November 2015.
 Statement to a Joint Hearing of the U.S. House Committee on Homeland Security and the House Committee on Foreign Affairs. The Rise of Radicalism: Growing Terrorist Sanctuaries and the Threat to the U.S. Homeland. 18 November 2015.
 Statement to the US Senate Committee on the Judiciary, Subcommittee on the Constitution. Drone Wars: The Constitutional and Counterterrorism Implications of Targeted Killing. 23 April 2013.  
 Statement to the House Committee on Foreign Affairs. After the Withdrawal: The Way Forward in Afghanistan and Pakistan. 19 March 2013.
 US House Armed Services Committee on Emerging Threats. Ten Years On: The Evolution of the Terrorist Threat Since 9/11. 25 May 2011.
 Statement to the House Committee on Homeland Security. Threats to the American Homeland: An Assessment. 24 May 2011.
 Statement to the Senate Foreign Relations Committee. Al Qaeda, the Taliban, and Other Extremist Groups in Pakistan. 15 September 2010.
 Statement to the House Homeland Security Committee. The Evolving Nature of Terrorism Nine Years after the 9/11 Attacks. 19 November 2009.
 Statement to the House Oversight Subcommittee on National Security and Foreign Affairs. Afghanistan and Pakistan: Understanding a Complex Threat Environment. 4 March 2009.
 US House Homeland Security Committee, Subcommittee on Intelligence. Reassessing the Evolving al-Qaeda Threat to the Homeland. 4 March 2009.
 US House Homeland Security Committee, Subcommittee on Intelligence. Reassessing the Evolving al-Qaeda Threat to the Homeland. March 4, 2009.
 US House Homeland Security, Subcommittee on Intelligence. Reassessing the Threat: The Future of Al Qaeda and its Implications for Homeland Security. 30 July 2008.
 Statement to the Senate Foreign Relations Committee. Confronting al Qaeda: Understanding the Threat in Afghanistan and Beyond. 30 July 2008.
 Statement to the House Permanent Select Committee on Intelligence. Assessing the Fight Against al Qaeda. 9 April 2008.
 US House Committee on Foreign Affairs. Afghanistan on the Brink: Where do we go from Here? 15 February 2007.
 US House Committee on International Relations. Islamic Extremism in Europe. 27 April 2005.

Documentaries

 The Fall of Osama bin Laden, National Geographic, 2022. Producer & Correspondent.
 The Longest War, Showtime, 2020. Producer.
 Bin Laden's Hard Drive, National Geographic, 2020. Producer & Correspondent.
 Legion of Brothers, CNN Films, 2017. Producer. Nominated for Emmy for Outstanding Politics and Government Documentary.
 Six, History, 2017 and 2018. Consulting Producer.
 Road to 9/11, History, 2017. Consultant.
 "We Got Him": President Obama, Bin Laden, and the Future of the War on Terror, CNN, 2016. Correspondent.
 Homegrown: The Counterterror Dilemma, HBO, 2016. Executive Producer. Adapted from Bergen's book United States of Jihad.
 American War Generals, National Geographic, 2014. Executive Producer, producer, Writer.
 Manhunt, HBO, 2012. Executive Producer. Won 2013 Emmy for Best Documentary. Based on Bergen's book of the same name.
 The Last Days of Osama bin Laden, National Geographic, 2011. Correspondent.
 Mission Ops: Assignment IEDs, Discovery, 2007. Correspondent.
 In the Footsteps of Osama bin Laden, CNN, 2006. Producer. Nominated for 2006 Emmy for Best News Documentary and named Best Documentary of 2006 by the Society of Professional Journalists. Based on Bergen's book The Osama bin Laden I Know.
 Al Qaeda 2.0, Discovery, 2003. Correspondent.
 Blinding Horizon, National Geographic, 2002. Correspondent.
 Holy War, Inc., National Geographic, 2001. Producer. Nominated for 2001 Emmy for Research. Based on Bergen's book of the same name.
 Osama bin Laden: Holy Terror? CNN, 1997. Producer.

Awards

 2018 Emmy Nomination for Outstanding Politics and Government documentary for Legion of Brothers.
 2014 Stephen E. Ambrose Oral History Award
 2012 Cornelius Ryan Award, Overseas Press Club, for Manhunt. Best non-fiction book on international affairs.
 2011 Gold Prize, Washington Institute for Near East Policy, for The Longest War. Best book on the Middle East. 
 2008 National Magazine Award nomination for a story on extraordinary rendition, which was part of the series "Torture Hits Home" by Mother Jones.
 2006 Emmy Award nomination for Outstanding Continuing Coverage of a News Story—Long Form for CNN's In the Footsteps of Bin Laden.
 2006 Best Documentary, Society of Professional Journalists, for CNN's In the Footsteps of Bin Laden.
 2002 Headliner Award for Attacks on America and Their Aftermath as part of CNN's Investigation Team.
 2001 Emmy Award nomination for Outstanding Individual Achievement in a Craft: Research for Holy War, Inc., a National Geographic Documentary.
 2001 Leonard Silk Journalism Fellowship, Century Foundation, for Holy War, Inc..
 2001 Pew Journalist-in-Residence, School of Advanced International Studies, Johns Hopkins University.
 1997 Joan Shorenstein Barone award for Washington Reporting.
 1997 National Headliner Award for CNN's Democracy in America series.
 1997 Livingston Award finalist for CNN's War on the Cocaine Cartel.
 1994 Emmy Award nomination for Outstanding Individual Achievement in a Craft: Writers for CNN's Kingdom of Cocaine.
 1994 Edward R. Murrow Award, Overseas Press Club, for Kingdom of Cocaine.

See also
 Manhunt: The Search for Bin Laden — HBO film based on Manhunt: The Ten-Year Search for Bin Laden from 9/11 to Abbottabad.
 A Very Stable Genius  — similar topics as Bergen's Trump and His Generals: The Cost of Chaos

References

External links

 
 Biography page at New America
 Peter Bergen on CNN
 Biography page at Arizona State University
 
 

Alumni of New College, Oxford
People educated at Ampleforth College
American reporters and correspondents
Johns Hopkins University faculty
CNN people
Living people
War on terror
American foreign policy writers
American male non-fiction writers
American male journalists
American documentary filmmakers
New America (organization)
21st-century American male writers
21st-century American journalists
21st-century American non-fiction writers
1962 births